Sadowiec may refer to the following places in Poland:
Sadowiec, Kuyavian-Pomeranian Voivodeship
Sadowiec, Łódź Voivodeship
Sadówiec, Masovian Voivodeship